Ceuthophilus seclusus, the secluded camel cricket, is a species of camel cricket in the family Rhaphidophoridae. It is found in North America.

References

seclusus
Articles created by Qbugbot
Insects described in 1894